The Edinburgh International Book Festival (EIBF) is a book festival that takes place in the last three weeks of August every year in Charlotte Square in the centre of Scotland’s capital city, Edinburgh.  Billed as The largest festival of its kind in the world, the festival hosts a concentrated flurry of cultural and political talks and debates, along with its well-established children's events programme.

It coincides with the Edinburgh International Festival and the Edinburgh Festival Fringe, as well as the other events that comprise the Edinburgh Festival.
Nick Barley is the Director.

History 
The first Book Festival took place in a tent in Edinburgh in 1983.  Initially a biennial event, it began to be held annually in 1997. It is a large (225,000 visitors in 2015) and growing international event, central to Edinburgh's acclaimed August arts celebrations. Perhaps partly as a result of this, Edinburgh was named the first UNESCO City of Literature in 2004. The Festival in Charlotte Square was cancelled in 2020 because of the COVID-19 pandemic but some events were held online.

Programme 
In 2016 there were over 800 authors and others from over 55 countries in the 17 days that the festival ran. Events ranged from writing workshops, education events, panel discussions, to talks and performances by international writers, poets, playwrights, musicians, illustrators, historians and philosophers. There are events for both adults and children.Past festivals have featured the likes of:

Running alongside the general programme is a Children's programme. Incorporating workshops, storytelling, panel discussions, author events and book signings, the Children's programme is popular with both the public and schools alike, and is among the world's largest books and reading event for young people. It regularly attracts authors like Jacqueline Wilson, Joan Lingard, Charlie Higson and Anne Fine.

There is also an Unbound programme which takes place in the evening, with free music and spoken word events sponsored by Edinburgh Gin.

In May 2016 a pilot satellite literary event, organised by the Book Festival, took place in Falkirk called LandWords. In August 2016, using the name Booked!, the Book Festival held events in three other locations in Scotland (Aberdeen, Greenock and Galashiels). This expansion was partially funded by the People's Postcode Lottery.

Venue 
Until 2019, the Book Festival was primarily held in a set of marquees in Charlotte Square Gardens, Edinburgh, at the West End of George Street. In 2017, the event and some venues expanded into George Street, partly to cope with visitor numbers but also to reduce the festival's impact on the privately owned gardens.

In 2021, the festival moved to the Edinburgh College of Art, where it is planned to stay until 2023. In May 2022, the organisers announced that the festival will move to a new permanent home in 2024, at the University of Edinburgh Futures Institute on the site of the former Royal Infirmary in Lauriston Place.

Fringe events
As with all large and successful festivals, the Book Festival has sprouted a number of fringe events over the years. In 2004 and 2006 an event called Thirsty Lunch promoted itself as a cheap, non-establishment alternative.

In 2008 there were two separate festivals running at the same time as the main Book Festival. The first was the Edinburgh Book Fringe, which held its events at the Word Power (now known as Lighthouse Books) bookshop  on Nicolson Street, Edinburgh. The second was the West Port Book Festival, which was centred on second-hand/antiquarian bookshops in the West Port area of the city. The latter ran from 2008 until 2012.  Both fringe festivals provided free events and were seen as a less formal alternatives to the main festival.

See also
James Tait Black Memorial Prize
 Book trade in the United Kingdom
 Books in the United Kingdom

References

External links

Official Edinburgh International Book Festival website
Official Edinburgh Festivals Guide

External links
Webcam coverage (during festival)
City Of Literature
Scottish Publishers Association
The Man Booker Prize Some of the longlisted authors attend the Festival

Recurring events established in 1983
1983 establishments in Scotland
Edinburgh Festival
Festivals in Edinburgh
Literary festivals in Scotland
Scottish literature